David Allen Tomlin (born June 22, 1949) is a retired American professional baseball player. During his 13-season career in Major League Baseball, he was a relief pitcher for the Cincinnati Reds (1972–73 and 1978–80), San Diego Padres (1974–77), Montreal Expos (1982 and 1986) and Pittsburgh Pirates (1983 and 1985). He also had a lengthy post-playing career as a pitching coach in the minor leagues.

Biography

Early Years
Tomlin was born in Maysville, Kentucky and graduated from West Union High School in West Union, Ohio.

Minor leagues
He was drafted by the Cincinnati Reds in the 29th round of the 1967 Major League Baseball Draft.

San Diego Padres

After appearing in 19 Games for the Cincinnati Reds in 1972 and 1973, Tomlin was traded by the Cincinnati Reds (along with Bobby Tolan) to the San Diego Padres for Clay Kirby. Tomlin's lone major league start came on June 23, 1976. Tomlin appeared regularly for the Padres from 1974-1977, having his best two seasons of his career, based on WAR in 1977 and 1978.

Cincinnati Reds
Tomlin was traded to the Texas Rangers after the 1978 season for Gaylord Perry. He returned to the Reds in March 1978 when the Reds purchased his contract from the Rangers. He had helped the Reds win the 1973 and again helped the 1979 win the NL West Division championships.  He appeared in four National League Championship series games, one in 1973 and three in 1979, and allowed eight hits and three earned runs in 4 innings pitched.

On September 2, 1980 he was released by the Cincinnati Reds. Tomlin was signed sign again with the Reds on April 22, 1982 as a Free Agent with the Reds. but did not appear in the majors that year.

Toronto Blue Jays
Tomlin signed with the Toronto Blue Jays before the 1981 season, but did not appear with the major league team that year. He was released by the Blue jays before the 1982 season.

Montreal Expos
Tomlin signed as a free agent with the Reds in 1982, but did not appear with the team that year. His contract was purchased late in the season by the Montreal Expos and he appeared in one game for the Expos that year. In 1986, Tomlin was signed as a free agent, appearing in 7 games for the Expos that year.

Pittsburgh Pirates
In 1983, the Pittsburgh Pirates purchased the contract of Tomlin, released Tomlin at the end of the season and then resigned him as a free agent in 1984. Tomlin appeared in a total of six games for the Pirates over 2 years.

Career totals
In 13 seasons, Tomlin had a win–loss record of 25–12 in 409 games, 1 game started, 138 games finished, 12 saves, 511 innings, 543 hits allowed, 261 runs allowed, 217 earned runs allowed, 32 home runs allowed, 198 walks, 278 strikeouts, 12 wild pitches, 2,239 batters faced, 58 intentional walks, 7 balks and a 3.82 earned run average.

Coach and manager
Tomlin became a pitching coach in the Montreal and Atlanta Braves organizations after his active career. He joined the Boston Red Sox in 1998 in a similar capacity, until 2006, when he was named manager of the Rookie-level Gulf Coast Red Sox of the Gulf Coast League. He served through 2010, compiling a five-year mark of 150–127 (.542), with one league championship (2006). He then shifted to a coaching position with the GCL Red Sox, working for six seasons (2011–16) in that post.

References

External links

Dave Tomlin at Baseball Almanac
Pura Pelota (Venezuelan Winter League)

1949 births
Living people
American expatriate baseball players in Canada
Asheville Tourists players
Baseball coaches from Kentucky
Baseball players from Kentucky
Cincinnati Reds players
Florida Instructional League Reds players
Hawaii Islanders players
Indianapolis Indians players
Major League Baseball pitchers
Minor league baseball managers
Montreal Expos players
Navegantes del Magallanes players
American expatriate baseball players in Venezuela
People from Maysville, Kentucky
Pittsburgh Pirates players
San Diego Padres players
Syracuse Chiefs players
Tampa Tarpons (1957–1987) players
Wichita Aeros players
Wytheville Reds players